Lewis Alexander Ochoa Cassiani (born 4 September 1984) is a Colombian footballer who plays as a right back for Once Caldas in the Categoría Primera A.

Clubs

References

Living people
1984 births
People from Antioquia
Colombian footballers
Association football defenders
Atlético Huila footballers
Independiente Medellín footballers
Millonarios F.C. players
Atlético Junior footballers
Atlético Bucaramanga footballers
Once Caldas footballers
Categoría Primera A players